Olympique de Marseille nearly crashed out of the French league following a chaotic season, in which all things that could go wrong, indeed went that way. Despite having several internationally respected players in the squad, only goal difference saved the team from being relegated. On the other hand, l'OM was only seven points behind Lens in fifth, suggesting that the league was the tightest ever.

Squad

Goalkeepers
  Stéphane Porato
  Cédric Carrasso
  Stéphane Trévisan

Defenders
  William Gallas
  Sébastien Pérez
  Jacques Abardonado
  Pierre Issa
  Eduardo Berizzo
  Loris Reina
  Lilian Martin
  Patrick Blondeau
  Lamine Diatta
  Jean-Pierre Cyprien
  Franck Dumas

Midfielders
  Daniel Montenegro
  Robert Pires
  Seydou Keita
  Iván de la Peña
  Frédéric Brando
  Jérôme Leroy
  Peter Luccin
  Djamel Belmadi
  Stéphane Dalmat
  Arthur Moses

Attackers
  Florian Maurice
  Kaba Diawara
  Ibrahima Bakayoko
  Cyrille Pouget
  Fabrizio Ravanelli
  Christophe Dugarry

Competitions

Division 1

League table

Results summary

Results by round

Matches

Topscorers
  Florian Maurice 8
  Ibrahima Bakayoko 8
  Fabrizio Ravanelli 6
  Cyrille Pouget 5
  Christophe Dugarry 3

Sources
 RSSSF - France 1999/2000

Olympique de Marseille seasons
Marseille